"A Message from the Sea" was a short story by Charles Dickens and Wilkie Collins written in 1860 for the Christmas issue of All the Year Round.

Plot summary 
The story begins with Captain Jorgan's arrival on a beautiful island, where he has to deliver a letter he found in a bottle during one of his travels to Alfred Raybrock, a young boy living on the island.

When they read the letter, it turns out that Alfred's father has stolen money, £5,000. Alfred was about to marry Kitty, but in order to investigate his father's crime, he breaks up the wedding and begins his journey to Lanren with Jorgan.

Jorgan and Alfred meet Keith's father, Mr. Tregarthen, who gives them the names of the elders of their village of Lanren. Jorgan interviews the listed individuals and other elders as well, although none of them know anything about the expedition.

As it later turned out, Alfred's brother, Hugh, was miraculously saved, and the person accused in the letter was Tregarthen himself. Hugh recounted his adventure to Jorgan, according to which, of the 5 surviving sailors, only Hugh and Clissold survived on the island.

Months later, an unknown ship survives the collision with the shore and they are seen as lost. The ship was discovered by pirates, who enslaved them. Clissold survived after 1 year, and Hugh suffered for 3 years. After escaping, Hugh went to Laren to investigate his father's case, where he accidentally met Alfred.

They discover that Mr. Tregarthen was involved in the story of the missing money, so they return to talk to him again to clarify everything. They find a desk at Tregarthen's old firm, with a missing sheet of ledger, after which Mr. Tregarthen recovers the stolen money. She gives the money to her daughter, Kitty, who in the following days marries Alfred.

References

External links

 

1860 short stories
Short stories by Charles Dickens